The Case of Private Hamp is a 1962 Australian television film which aired on the ABC. Despite the wiping of the era, a copy of the presentation exists as a kinescope recording.

It was based on a 1955 novel by James Lansdale Hodson which was turned into the 1964 film King and Country. The novel had been adapted for radio in Melbourne in 1957.

Plot
The court martial of Private Arthur Hamp who was accused of desertion in Passchendaele, France, 1917. He is defended by Hargreaves.

Cast
Edward Hepple as Private Hamp
John Llewellyn as Lt Webb
Ric Hutton as Captain Hargreaves
John Armstrong as Cpl Haslem
Donald Philps as Col Eckersley
Rhod Walker as court martial president
Richard Howe as Lt Midgeley
James Scullin as Cpl Barnes
Richard Parry as Captain O'Sullivan
Ron Haddrick as padre
John O'Sullivan as Johnson
Don Pascoe as sergeant major

Production
Designer Jack Montgomery created trenches by mixing bran with black earth. The cast was all male. Ric Hutton had just appeared in a TV production of Madam Butterfly.

Hepple called it "a marvelous play about what I consider to be legalised murder. It should bring tears to the eyes of anyone who watches it."

Reception
The TV critic for the Sydney Morning Herald said it featured "capable acting"

The Sunday Sydney Morning Herald critic called it "a first rate piece of drama, with a case and a quality of acting that was well-nigh flawless."

The Woman's Weekly called it "one of the strongest and most moving plays yet presented on TV."

See also
List of television plays broadcast on Australian Broadcasting Corporation (1960s)

References

External links
The Case of Private Hamp on IMDb
The Case of Private Hamp at National Film and Sound Archive

1962 television plays
1960s Australian television plays
Australian Broadcasting Corporation original programming
English-language television shows
Black-and-white Australian television shows
Films based on British novels